Democracy is a play by Michael Frayn which premiered in London at the Royal National Theatre on September 9, 2003. Directed by Michael Blakemore, and starring Roger Allam as Willy Brandt and Conleth Hill as Günter Guillaume, it won the Evening Standard and Critics' Circle awards for Best Play.

Democracy premiered on Broadway at the Brooks Atkinson Theatre on November 18, 2004, and ran for 173 performances. It was nominated for the Tony Award and Drama Desk Award as Best Play.

It has also been staged in Copenhagen, Oslo, Stockholm, Helsinki (2005), Wellington, Vancouver, Toronto and Moscow (2016).

A revival of the play, directed by Paul Miller at Sheffield's Crucible Theatre, transferred to London's Old Vic Theatre in 2012.

The play, based on actual events, deals with the decision West German chancellor Willy Brandt had to make about exposing the Communist spy Günter Guillaume who worked as his secretary and had heard some of the state's most important secrets.

Original London cast
 Willy Brandt – Roger Allam
 Hans-Dietrich Genscher – Nicholas Blane
 Ulrich Bauhaus – Paul Broughton
 Horst Ehmke – Jonathan Coy
 Günther Nollau – Christopher Ettridge
 Helmut Schmidt – Glyn Grain
 Reinhard Wilke – Paul Gregory
 Günter Guillaume – Conleth Hill
 Arno Kretschmann – Steven Pacey
 Herbert Wehner – David Ryall

Original Broadway cast (principals)
 Willy Brandt – James Naughton
 Günter Guillaume – Richard Thomas
 Arno Kretschmann – Michael Cumpsty
 Herbert Wehner – Robert Prosky
 Reinhard Wilke – Terry Beaver
 Helmut Schmidt – John Dossett

References

External links
 Internet Broadway Database listing
 Interview with Michael Frayn September 19, 2003
 broadwaycom.com summary of critics

Plays by Michael Frayn
2003 plays
Willy Brandt